Morum tuberculosum is a species of sea snail, a marine gastropod mollusk in the family Harpidae, the harp snails.

Description

Distribution
Shallow water, Baja California to Peru.

References

Harpidae
Gastropods described in 1842